The 2021 Kansas Jayhawks football team represented the University of Kansas in the 2021 NCAA Division I FBS football season. It was the Jayhawks 132nd season. They were members of the Big 12 Conference. They played their home games at David Booth Kansas Memorial Stadium. They were coached by Lance Leipold in his first year as head coach.

The Jayhawks entered the season with multiple losing streaks: 41 games to AP ranked teams, 54 road conference games, twelve conference games, and an overall losing streak of thirteen. Only one of the streaks would still be standing by the end of the season. They would end their thirteen game overall losing streak with their victory over South Dakota on September 3, 2021. Their victory over Texas on November 13 ended several more losing streaks: 8 straight overall losses, 18 straight within the Big 12, 20 straight to FBS opponents, and 56 straight in road conference games. They lost all their games against AP poll ranked teams during the season extending the streak to 44 games. The Jayhawks also failed to qualify for a bowl game for the 13th consecutive season, dating back to the 2008 season. They finished last in the Big 12 for the 7th consecutive season.

Les Miles departure
On March 5, 2021, head coach Les Miles, was placed on administrative leave following allegations of inappropriate comments and actions with female students while the head coach at LSU. Kansas and Miles agreed to mutually part ways on March 8, 2021. Wide receivers coach Emmett Jones served as interim coach from March 11 through the team's spring practices at the end of April. On April 30, Lance Leipold was hired as the head coach.

Offseason

Starters lost
Overall, the Jayhawks had 17 players run out of eligibility. Below are the starters from 2020 who have run out of eligibility.

Coaching staff changes
Including new head coach Lance Leipold, the Jayhawks will have five new coaches on their coaching staff replacing five coaches, which includes filling one position that was officially vacant the previous season.

Recruiting
The Jayhawks have 22 commitments for their 2021 recruiting class. Below is the breakdown. The only positions KU did not have any recruits for were kicker and punter.

Overall class ranking

Positional breakdown

Transfers
Only notable transfers are listed below. Kansas had 27 players transfer out and 13 transfer in.

Incoming

Outgoing

Entered NFL draft

Left during season

Big 12 media poll
The 2021 media poll was released on July 8, 2021. The Jayhawks were picked last for the 11th consecutive season receiving all 39 potential last place votes.

Schedule

Source:

Roster

Coaching staff

Game Summaries

vs. South Dakota

In the first game of the Lance Leipold era, the Jayhawks played South Dakota. The Jayhawks would score a touchdown first in the second quarter with a 8-yard pass by Jason Bean, a transfer from North Texas. After halftime, Kansas would take a 10–0 lead after a 30-yard field goal by Jacob Borcila. South Dakota would score two touchdowns to take their first lead with 5 minutes and 13 seconds left in the game. Kansas would then answer that touchdown with their own touchdown after Bean's second passing touchdown of the game with 1 minute and 3 seconds left. South Dakota would turn the ball over on downs after the kickoff to give the Jayhawks their first win since October 26, 2019, breaking a 13-game losing streak.

at No. 17 Coastal Carolina

Kansas would strike first kicking with a 46-yard field goal in their first road game of the season. Coastal Carolina would respond with a touchdown on the following drive to take the lead, only for the Jayhawks to take the lead back 9–7. They would not hold a lead for the rest of the game as Coastal Carolina would outscore the Jayhawks 42–13 the rest of the game. The loss extended the Jayhawks losing streak to teams ranked in the AP poll to 42 games.

vs Baylor

In the Jayhawks Big 12 opener, they struggled to keep up with Baylor being outgained by Baylor 576–166. Jason Bean also had his fewest passing yards of the season to that point in the game with only 57, but was still the Jayhawks leading rusher. The Jayhawks lost the game after never leading at any point 7–45. The loss was the Jayhawks' 15th consecutive loss to FBS opponents and their 13th consecutive loss in the Big 12.

at Duke

The first half featured a back and forth game. The entire second quarter, the teams traded touchdowns. The Jayhawks went into halftime with a 24–21 lead. Duke would begin to pull away in the second half, however. The Blue Devils finished the game on a 31–9 run to win the game 52–33. The game was the Jayhawks most points scored and the most yards they put up in the season to that point. Kansas quarterback Jason Bean set a career high with 323 yards, but also threw two interceptions. His first interception was the first he had thrown in the season. The loss extended the Jayhawks losing streak to FBS teams to 16.

at Iowa State

The Jayhawks began the game making early mistakes, two costly turnovers and missed field goal. The turnovers were a lost fumble on a run by quarterback Jason Bean and an interception in the redzone. Both turnovers and the missed field goal led to touchdowns from Iowa State. The Jayhawks would go into halftime with a 38–0 deficit. They would score first in the second half, but that would be followed by 21 unanswered points by Iowa State. The loss increased the Jayhawks road conference losing streak to 55 games.

vs Texas Tech

The Jayhawks were dominated throughout most of the game, including trailing at halftime 24–0. Texas Tech would eventually score 41 unanswered points through 59 minutes of gametime. The Jayhawks wouldn't score until there were 52 seconds left in the game. They would score again with 5 seconds left to make the final score 41–14. The game extended the Jayhawks conference losing streak to 15 games and their losing streak against FBS opponents to 18 games.

vs No. 3 Oklahoma

Despite a power outage in the stadium in the first quarter, the Jayhawks jumped out to a 10–0, a lead they carried into halftime. Oklahoma wouldn't score until halfway through the 3rd quarter to make the game 10–7. Kansas would respond on the following drive with their own touchdown to get back to a 10-point lead. The Sooners would then score 21 unanswered points, including a touchdown following a controversial 4th down call in the fourth quarter. The Jayhawks would score again with 5:56 left in the game, but OU would put the game away with a touchdown with 42 seconds left. KU lost despite outgaining OU on offense and winning the time of possession battle. The loss extended the Jayhawks losing streak to teams ranked in the AP poll to 43 games. The loss also extended the Jayhawks conference losing streak to 16 games and their losing streak against FBS opponents to 19 games.

at No. 15 Oklahoma State

The Jayhawks were dominated in the first half. They went into halftime down 38–0. They also failed to earn a first down in the first half, while allowing 21 first downs. They were outgained 331–49. The Cowboys had their backup quarterback in by the end of the first half. The Jayhawks would lose 55–3, tying their worse loss of the season. The loss extended the Jayhawks losing streak to teams ranked in the AP poll to 44 games. The loss also extended the Jayhawks conference losing streak to 17 games and their losing streak against FBS opponents to 20 games. The loss also made the Jayhawks ineligible for a bowl game for the 13th consecutive season.

vs Kansas State

Early in the game, the Jayhawks had their starting quarterback and backup quarterback go down with an injury. K-State would just be too much for the Jayhawks as KU wouldn't score its first touchdown until the 3rd quarter. The 35–10 loss is the Jayhawks 8th straight overall loss, 18th straight within the Big 12, 20th straight to FBS opponents, and their 13th straight loss to their cross state rival K-State.

at Texas

The Jayhawks jumped out to a 14–0 lead in the game, only for Texas to score 14 unanswered points to the tie game. Kansas would then score three touchdowns in 1:25 of game time to make the score 35–14 at halftime. Texas would outscore the Jayhawks 35–14 in the second half to send the game into overtime. The Longhorns would score in three plays on their first possession, but a unsportsmanlike conduct penalty would give the Jayhawks a short field to start their possession. A two yard run from Devin Neal made the score 56–55 Texas. Kansas coach Lance Leipold would take the risky play and go for the two point conversion. The risk would prove successful as Jared Casey would catch the pass in the end zone giving KU the win 57–56. The win ended multiple losing streaks for Kansas: 8 straight overall losses, 18 straight within the Big 12, 20 straight to FBS opponents, and 56 straight in road conference games. The win was also the Jayhawks first ever victory in Austin and only their 4th all-time victory against Texas. The Jayhawks last defeated the Longhorns in 2016, however, prior to that, they hadn't defeated Texas since 1938.

at TCU

TCU struck first in the 1st quarter. KU would score 14 unanswered point in response to take a 14–7 lead into halftime. TCU would begin the second half with 21 unanswered points to take a 28–14 lead. KU would respond with 14 unanswered points to tie it 28–28 with just under 5 minutes left. TCU would drive down the field and get into field goal position with 1:05 left on the clock, but KU coach Lance Leipold did not call any of his three timeouts until there was 25 seconds left. TCU would kick a field goal with 6 seconds left. The Jayhawks attempted several laterals on the kickoff return, but failed to make the miracle play.

vs West Virginia

The Jayhawks would strike first on senior night with a field goal. However, this would be the only time Kansas would lead in the game. West Virginia scored a touchdown in the first quarter to take the lead. Kansas responded with a field goal. West Virginia and Kansas would trade touchdowns afterwards. The Mountaineers would take a 21–13 lead to halftime. Kansas would score first in the second half with an interception returned for a touchdown. West Virginia would score a touchdown and two field goals to take a 34–21 lead. The Jayhawks would score a late touchdown but it would be too late as they would lose 34–28.

All-Big 12 selections
Second team
 DE Kyron Johnson
 S Kenny Logan Jr.

Honorable mention
 OL Earl Bostick Jr.
 WR Kwamie Lassiter II
 S Kenny Logan Jr.
 LB Rich Miller
 RB Devin Neal
 OL Mike Novitsky

References

Kansas
Kansas Jayhawks football seasons
Kansas Jayhawks football